Artan Thorja (born 9 March 1993, in Shkodër) is an Albanian footballer, who plays for Greek fourth tier side Ermis Zoniana.

Club career
Thorja is a product of Iraklis' academies. In 2011, after Iraklis was demoted to the amateur Delta Ethniki, he was promoted to the first-team squad, but could not compete, as foreign players were not allowed in Delta Ethniki. He finally made his first-team debut in a promotion play-off match against Panetolikos on 19 June 2013. He played two games in his two senior years by Iraklis in the Greek Football League, before he returned to the Albanian Superliga. He signed a contract on 28 January 2014 with the vice champion FK Kukësi.

References

External links

 Profile - FSHF
 	

1993 births
Living people
Footballers from Shkodër
Albanian footballers
Association football fullbacks
Iraklis Thessaloniki F.C. players
FK Kukësi players
KF Laçi players
KS Ada Velipojë players
Kategoria Superiore players
Kategoria e Parë players
Kategoria e Dytë players
Albanian expatriate footballers
Expatriate footballers in Greece
Albanian expatriate sportspeople in Greece